Alexandre-Athenase Noghès (15 June 1916 – 16 February 1999) was an international tennis champion, married Marinette Bastel, having one son Lionel (racing driver), best known as the first husband of Princess Antoinette of Monaco, whom he married as his second wife on 4 December 1951.

Noghès' grandfather Alexandre was the founder of the Monaco Automobile Club and former general treasurer of Monaco's state finances. His father, Antony (1890–1978), created the first Grand Prix ever raced in a city, the world-famous Grand Prix de Monaco. Antony also created the renowned Rallye Monte Carlo and is credited with imposing the chequered flag in Grand Prix racing.

Noghès entered into a liaison with Princess Antoinette of Monaco in the mid-1940s and three children were born to the couple: Elizabeth-Ann (1947–2020), Christian-Louis (born 1949) and Christine-Alix (1951–1989). They were married in a civil ceremony in Genoa on 4 December 1951, and divorced three years later in 1954.

Following their divorce, Noghès settled in the United States and married Margaret James.

References

External links
 
 
 

1916 births
1999 deaths
Monegasque male tennis players
Monegasque Roman Catholics